The 1923 Liège–Bastogne–Liège was the 13th edition of the Liège–Bastogne–Liège cycle race and was held on 3 June 1923. The race started and finished in Liège. The race was won by René Vermandel.

General classification

References

1923
1923 in Belgian sport